Two male athletes from Kyrgyzstan competed at the 1996 Summer Paralympics in Atlanta, United States.

See also
Kyrgyzstan at the Paralympics
Kyrgyzstan at the 1996 Summer Olympics

References 

Nations at the 1996 Summer Paralympics
1996
Summer Paralympics